The pancreaticoduodenal veins accompany their corresponding arteries:  the superior pancreaticoduodenal artery and the inferior pancreaticoduodenal artery; the lower of the two frequently joins the right gastroepiploic vein.

References

External links

Veins of the torso